Huntley is a settlement in Lot 3 township, in Prince Edward Island.

Communities in Prince County, Prince Edward Island